The Critics' Choice Movie Award for Best Acting Ensemble is one of the awards given to people working in the motion picture industry by the Broadcast Film Critics Association.

2000s

2001 
 Gosford Park
 Ocean's Eleven
 The Royal Tenenbaums

2002 
 Chicago
 The Hours
 My Big Fat Greek Wedding

2003 
 The Lord of the Rings: The Return of the King
 Love Actually
 A Mighty Wind
 Mystic River

2004 
 Sideways
 Closer
 The Life Aquatic with Steve Zissou
 Ocean's Twelve

2005 
 Crash
 Good Night, and Good Luck.
 Rent
 Sin City
 Syriana

2006 
 Little Miss Sunshine
 Babel
 Bobby
 The Departed
 Dreamgirls
 A Prairie Home Companion

2007 
 Hairspray
 Before the Devil Knows You're Dead
 Gone Baby Gone
 Juno
 No Country for Old Men
 Sweeney Todd: The Demon Barber of Fleet Street

2008 
 Milk
 The Curious Case of Benjamin Button
 The Dark Knight
 Doubt
 Rachel Getting Married

2009 
 Inglourious Basterds
 Nine
 Precious
 Star Trek
 Up in the Air

2010s

2020s

References

Film awards for Best Cast